Peggy Gou is a South Korean DJ and record producer based in Germany. She has released seven EPs on record labels including Ninja Tune and Phonica. In 2019, she launched her own independent record label, Gudu Records, and released a DJ-Kicks compilation, DJ-Kicks: Peggy Gou, on !k7 Records.

Early life and education 
Peggy Gou was born Kim Min-ji, in Incheon, South Korea, on 3 July 1991. Her father, Kim Chang-yong, is a former journalist, a professor of mass communication at Inje University and standing commissioner of Korea Communications Commission. Gou began classical piano lessons at age 8. At age 14, her parents sent her to London, England to study English. She moved back to Korea when she was 18 years old, but six months later she returned to London to study fashion at the London College of Fashion. After graduating, she worked as the London correspondent editor for Harper's Bazaar Korea, and then moved to Berlin, Germany.

Career 
Gou was taught to DJ in 2009 by her friend from Korea. She had her first gig in Cirque Le Soir, Soho, and later performed weekly at The Book Club, East London. In 2013, she learned to use Ableton Live and began to create her own tracks. Her first track, Hungboo, was completed in 2014. Hungboo was named for the hero of a Korean fairy tale. She played the track in Korea for the first time at the 2016 Style Icon Awards opening show, featuring award-winning actor Yoo Ah-in in a visual art video.

Gou made her recording debut in January 2016 on Radio Slave's Rekids label with The Art of War Part 1, featuring a remix from Galcher Lustwerk. She next released four EPs including Seek for Maktoop, with hit track It Makes You Forget (Itgehane). Maktoop was named after the Arabic word "maktoob", the equivalent to "written" or "destiny". This was followed by EPs Once and Han Jan in 2018, and Moment in April 2019. Once is the first time she has sung on a record.

Gou embarked on her first North American tour and made a Boiler Room debut in NYC in 2017. She became the first Korean DJ to play in Berlin's nightclub Berghain. She plays more than one hundred live gigs in a year and has performed alongside the likes of Moodymann, The Blessed Madonna and DJ Koze. She has since had gigs in the worldwide festival sets at Coachella, Glastonbury, Sonus in Croatia, Amsterdam's Dekmantel, London's Printworks, Ibiza, Amsterdam Dance Event, Primavera Sound in Portugal, Barcelona's Sónar, as well as Virgil Abloh's Off-White fashion show among others. In an Interview with Vice, she stated that she preferred to stay out of politics and would just perform for the people who want to hear her music.

Gou released her music on record labels Ninja Tune and Phonica in 2018. That same year, It Makes You Forget (Itgehane) won Best Track at the AIM Independent Music Awards. It Makes You Forget (Itgehane) was also listed on the tracklist for FIFA 2019.

In 2019, Forbes named Gou as one of the Asian leaders, pioneers and entrepreneurs under age 30. She launched her own fashion label KIRIN ("giraffe" in Korean), supported by Virgil Abloh, under the New Guards Group in February, followed by her own independent record label, Gudu Records (gudu means "shoes" in Korean) in March. She has stated that she launched Gudu to give artists starting out better opportunities and treatment than she received at the beginning of her career. She next released DJ-Kicks: Peggy Gou, the 69th installment of !K7's DJ-Kicks mix compilation in June. The album became her first Billboard chart appearance, reaching 9th in Dance/Electronic Album Sales, and the second compilation that ever got into the top 10 after Moodymann's. In July, Gou released her first music video for her hit 2019 track Starry Night exclusively on Apple Music, directed by Jonas Lindstroem, and once again featured Yoo Ah-in, the lead actor in the award-winning South Korean film, Burning. The music video was released worldwide on YouTube in September 2019.

In December 2020, Gou joined Apple Music's New Year's Eve DJ Mixes with 21 other electronic artists. She next released her seventh single Nabi in June 2021, featuring Oh Hyuk from Korean indie rock band Hyukoh, followed by a tribute to her teenage years, I Go, that she called "My own reimagination of the sounds I grew up loving."

Discography

DJ mixes 
 DJ-Kicks: Peggy Gou (2019)

Extended plays 
 Art of War (2016)
 Art of War (Part II) (2016)
 Seek for Maktoop (2016)
 Once (2018)
 Moment (2019)

Singles 
 "Day Without Yesterday" / "Six O Six"
 "It Makes You Forget (Itgehane)"
 "Han Jan"
 "Travelling Without Arriving"
 "It Makes You Forget (Itgehane) [Remixes]"
 "Starry Night"
 "Nabi"
 "I Go"

References 

1991 births
Living people
Musicians from Incheon
South Korean expatriates in Germany
South Korean pianists
Electronic dance music DJs
South Korean DJs
German DJs